Dmitri Alekseyevich Shlyakhtin (born 19 October 1981) is a former Russian professional football player.

Club career
He played in the Russian Football National League for FC Neftekhimik Nizhnekamsk in 2002.

See also
Football in Russia

References

1981 births
Living people
Russian footballers
Association football defenders
FC Neftekhimik Nizhnekamsk players
FC Dynamo Kirov players